The 1933–34 season was Chelsea Football Club's twenty-fifth competitive season. The club had a new manager for the first time since 1907, as long-serving David Calderhead left during the close-season, and was succeeded by Leslie Knighton.

Table

References

External links
 1933–34 season at stamford-bridge.com

1933–34
English football clubs 1933–34 season